Salamanca is a city in western Spain and is the capital of the Province of Salamanca in the autonomous community of Castile and León. The city lies on several rolling hills by the Tormes River. Its Old City was declared a UNESCO World Heritage Site in 1988. As of 2018, the municipality has a population of 143,978.

It is one of the most important university cities in Spain and supplies 16% of Spain's market for the teaching of the Spanish language. Salamanca attracts thousands of international students.

The University of Salamanca, founded in 1218, is the oldest university in Spain and the third oldest western university. Pope Alexander IV gave universal validity to its degrees. With 30,000 students, the university is, together with tourism, a primary source of income in Salamanca. It is on the Vía de la Plata path of the Camino de Santiago.

History

The city originates as a Celtiberian fort of the pre-Roman period, built by the Vaccaei  or the Vettones as one of a pair of forts to defend their territory near the Duero river. 
In 220 BC Hannibal laid siege to the fort and captured it.  With the fall of the Carthaginians to the Romans, the city of Helmantica, as it was known, began to take more importance as a commercial hub in the Roman Hispania Lusitania due to its favorable location on a Roman road, known as the Vía de la Plata, which connected it with Emerita Augusta (present day Mérida) to the south and Asturica Augusta (present-day Astorga) to the north. 
Salamanca's Tormes bridge, built in the 1st century, was a part of this road.

The origin of the name is unknown. Polybius calls it Helmantike, while Ptolemy has Salmatike.
Titus Livius and Plutarchus have Hermandica and Salmatike, respectively. Polyaenus has Salmantida or Salmatis.
In a foundational myth, the city was associated with Teucer, mythological king of Salamis.

With the fall of the Roman Empire, the Alans established in Lusitania. Later the city was conquered by the Visigoths and included in their territory. The city was already an  episcopal see, and signatures of bishops of Salamanca are found in the Councils of Toledo.

Salamanca surrendered to the Umayyad invasion, led by Musa bin Nusair, in 712 AD. The area from this city on the Tormes River north to the Duero River then became the main battlefield between the Christian kingdoms and the Muslim Al-Andalus rulers. The constant fighting of the Kingdom of León, later reinforced by union with the Kingdom of Castile, against the Caliphate depopulated Salamanca and reduced it to an unimportant settlement. After the battle of Simancas (939) the Christians resettled this area. After the 1085 seizure of Toledo by Alfonso VI of León and Castile, the definitive resettlement of the city took place. Raymond of Burgundy, instructed by his father-in-law Alfonso VI of León, led a group of settlers of various origins in 1102.

One of the most important moments in Salamanca's history was the year 1218, when Alfonso IX of León granted a royal charter to the University of Salamanca, although formal teaching had existed at least since 1130. Soon it became one of the most significant and prestigious academic centres in Europe.

The 15th century was plagued by social conflict and tensions among the urban elites (a complex development, often oversimplified as an infighting between bandos), with occasional outbursts of grave episodes of violence, conveying a chronic feeling of insecurity.

The late 15th century population has been tentatively estimated at 15,000–25,000. By the turn of the 16th century most of the population dwelled at the right (north) bank of the Tormes, with a small arrabal in the south bank inhabited by roughly 300 people.

During the 16th century, the city reached its height of splendour (around 6,500 students and a total population of 24,000). During that period, the University of Salamanca hosted the most important intellectuals of the time; these groups of mostly-Dominican scholars were designated the School of Salamanca. The juridical doctrine of the School of Salamanca represented the end of medieval concepts of law, and founded the fundamental body of the ulterior European law and morality concepts, including rights as a corporeal being (right to life), economic rights (right to own property) and spiritual rights (rights to freedom of thought and rights related to intrinsic human dignity).

In 1551, the Holy Roman Emperor Charles V ordered an inquiry to find out if the science of Andreas Vesalius, physician and anatomist, was in line with Catholic doctrine. Vesalius came to Salamanca that same year to appear before the board and was acquitted.

Salamanca suffered the general downturns of the Kingdom of Castile during the 17th century, but in the 18th century it experienced a rebirth. In this period, the new baroque cathedral and main square (Plaza Mayor) were finished.

In the Peninsular War theatre of the Napoleonic Wars, the Battle of Salamanca took place on 22 July 1812 in the nearby fields of Arapiles, in which an Anglo-Portuguese Army led by Wellington decisively defeated the French army of Marmont. The western quarter of Salamanca was seriously damaged by cannon fire. The battle which raged that day is famous as a defining moment in military history  and thirteen thousand men were killed or wounded in the space of only a few short hours.

During the devastating Spanish Civil War (1936–1939) the city quickly went over to the Nationalist side and was temporarily used as the de facto headquarters for the rebel faction. Francisco Franco was proclaimed Generalissimo on 21 September 1936 while at the city. In April 1937, the FET y de las JONS, the single party of the ensuing dictatorship, was created via a Unification Decree issued at the city upon the merging of the fascist Falange and the traditionalist carlists. The Nationalists soon moved most of the administrative premises to Burgos, which, being more central, was better suited for this purpose. However, some administrative apparatus, Franco's headquarters (located at the Palacio Episcopal, next to the Old Cathedral) and the military commands stayed in Salamanca, along with the German and Italian fascist delegations, making it the de facto Nationalist capital and centre of power during the entire civil war. Like much of fervently Catholic and largely rural Leon and Old Castile regions, Salamanca was a staunch supporter of the Nationalist side and Francisco Franco's regime for its long duration.

In 1988, the old city was declared a UNESCO World Heritage Site. In 1998, it was declared a European Capital of Culture for year 2002 (shared with Bruges). During 14 and 15 October 2005, it hosted the XV Ibero-American Summits of Heads of State and Governments.

Since 1996, Salamanca has been the designated site of the archives of the Spanish Civil War (Archivo General de la Guerra Civil Española). The original documents were assembled by the Francoist regime, selectively obtained from the administrative departments of various institutions and organizations during the Spanish Civil War as a repressive instrument used against opposition groups and individuals. The socialist government moved the Catalan part of the archive to Barcelona in 2006 despite opposition from the local authorities and popular protests.

Geography

Location 
The city lies on the banks of the Tormes river, a major left-bank tributary of the Douro. It is also part of the Vía de la Plata, an ancient S–N path in Western Spain.

Climate
With an altitude of over 800 meters, Salamanca has a warm-summer Mediterranean climate (Csb) according to the Köppen climate classification, with some cold semi-arid climate (BSk) climatic influences, resulting in large diurnal temperature variations, with hot summers and chilly winters, and nearly-semi-arid levels of precipitation. Salamanca does not have a real wet season. Most of the precipitation falls outside of the summer, with upticks at the end of the spring and during the winter; all winters have snow during few days per year, although heavy snowfalls are uncommon, but not unheard of. The city averages around 7 days of snowy days per year, morning frost during winters is very common, as on a normal year, Salamanca has on average 76 days with low temperatures below freezing.

University
The University of Salamanca was founded in 1134 and in 1218 it was given the royal charter of foundation ("Estudio General") by Alfonso IX of León. It was the first university to receive the title of "University" in 1254.  Under the patronage of the learned Alfonso X, its wealth and reputation greatly increased (1252–1282), and its schools of canon law and civil law attracted students even from the Universities of Paris and Bologna. In the 16th century,  the city's fortunes depended on those of the university. About the time Christopher Columbus was lecturing there on his discoveries, Hernán Cortés took classes at Salamanca, but returned home in 1501 at age 17, without completing his course of study. (About ten years later the conquistador Francisco Vásquez de Coronado was born in Salamanca.)

Economy

The city's economy is dominated by the university and tourism, but other sectors including agriculture and livestock rearing along with construction and manufacturing are also significant. Not surprisingly, in December 2007 83% of the working population, equivalent to 55,838, were employed in the service sector.

Industry
Industrial activity accounted for 5% of the working population, or 3,340 workers employed over 360 businesses.
Two of the largest businesses, both of them numbered among the largest 100 enterprises in the region, are the veterinary vaccine manufacturer "Laboratorios Intervet", and the fertilizer specialist manufacturers S.A. Mirat, which is the city's oldest industrial company, having been established originally as a starch factory in 1812.

Transport

Road
Highways
A50: Autovía de la Cultura: Ávila - Salamanca
A62: Autovía de Castilla: Burgos - Valladolid - Salamanca - Ciudad Rodrigo.
A66: Autovía Ruta de la Plata: Gijón - Oviedo - Mieres - Puerto de Pajares - León - Benavente - Zamora - Salamanca - Béjar - Plasencia - Mérida - Sevilla.
SA-11: North access to Salamanca.
SA-20: South access to Salamanca.

Other roads
N-501: Ávila - Peñaranda de Bracamonte - Salamanca.
N-620: Burgos - Venta de Baños - Valladolid -  Tordesillas - Salamanca - Ciudad Rodrigo - Portugal.

Airport

Public transport
There are 13 bus lines during the day and two night lines. Also, a tram line has been proposed.

Culture and sports
The Old City of Salamanca was declared a UNESCO World Heritage Site in 1988. In 2002, Salamanca shared the title of European Capital of Culture with Bruges. In 2005, Salamanca celebrated the 250th anniversary of the construction of the Plaza Mayor with a number of European events (Plaza Mayor de Europa).

Festivals

Holy Week

The Holy Week in Salamanca (Semana Santa) is the most well-known feast in the city. Salamanca is renowned for the solemn and sober processions celebrated during Holy Week. 18, 10,000 brothers or "cofrades", 50 floats or "pasos" celebrate the Passion of Christ with 24 processions and thousands of followers, tourist and visitors.

Some of the celebrations have been performed for centuries. The confraternities carry artistic pasos created by important Spanish artists such as Luis Salvador Carmona, Alejandro Carnicero or Mariano Benlliure. In 2003 the Semana Santa of Salamanca obtained the official declaration of International Touristic Interest.

Other 
Salamanca is also famous throughout Spain and the rest of Europe for its celebrations of "Nochevieja Universitaria", loosely translated as "University New Year". It is usually held on the Thursday of the last week of school in December and two weeks before the real New Year's Eve. On this day, students congregate in the Plaza Mayor, Salamanca to watch free performances and take part in the countdown to midnight.

Sports

From 1923 onward, "Los Charros,” formally the Union Deportiva Salamanca, were the Salamanca football team. In 2013, the club went bankrupt and its activities were abandoned. After its dissolution, some managers of the entity decided to refound the farm team to continue competing, maintaining the legacy of the historic club. Thus they created the Club de Fútbol Salmantino.

The first high jump over 8 feet (2.44 m) was made in Salamanca, by Javier Sotomayor in 1993. His jump, of 2.45 m (8 feet 0.46 inch), is still the world record in the event.

Local teams
Salamanca CF, football team 
Unionistas de Salamanca CF, football team
CB Avenida, basketball team
Club Natación Acuático Salamanca, swimming team

Cinema
The setting provided by the city has been featured in several films, including Ridley Scott's 1492: Conquest of Paradise and Miloš Forman's Goya's Ghosts. Alejandro Amenábar's 2019 historical film While at War is set in Salamanca and features scenes shot there. Salamanca was also the setting for the 2008 political thriller Vantage Point, although the movie was almost exclusively filmed in Mexico.

Gastronomy

Among many local dishes,  (steamed rice with pork) is very popular. Another distinctive dish is the cocido, a slow-cooked chickpea-based casserole. However, hornazo, a meat pie, is the most popular dish.

Sister cities and twin towns 
Coimbra (Portugal); since 1981.
Würzburg (Germany); since 1981.
Hefei (China); since 2022.

Notable people

Public service

Alfonso XI of Castile (1311–1350), King of Castile and León.
Miguel Ramírez de Salamanca (died 1534), Bishop of Santiago de Cuba, 1530–1534.
Beatriz Galindo (ca.1465 – 1535), a Spanish Latinist, writer, humanist and teacher
Francisco de Montejo (ca.1479 – ca.1553), conquistador in Mexico and Central America.
Francisco Vázquez de Coronado (1510–1554), conquistador in Mexico to Kansas.
Juan Vázquez de Coronado (1523–1565) conquistador, colonised Costa Rica
Baldassare de Benavente (1638–1687), a Roman Catholic prelate & Bishop of Potenza 
Jerónimo Bécker (1857-1925) historian, diplomat and journalist.
José María Lamamié de Clairac y Colina (1887-1956), politician
José María Gil-Robles (1898–1980), politician
Antolín de Santiago (born 1918), former politician, lawyer, professor, journalist & Mayor of Valladolid, 1971/1974. 
Elena Catena (1920–2012), university professor, philologist, publisher and feminist.
Francisco Rodríguez Adrados (1922–2020), Hellenist, linguist and translator
Eleuterio Sánchez (born 1942), former Spanish thief, today lawyer and published writer.
Fernando Vérgez Alzaga (born 1945), Secretary General of the Governorate of Vatican City State
Alfonso Fernández Mañueco (born 1965), politician, Mayor of Salamanca, 2011 to 2018.
Juan Moreno Yagüe (born 1973), a Spanish lawyer, activist and politician.

The Arts 
Fernando Gallego (1440–1507), Spanish painter, Hispano-Flemish in style.
Lucas Fernández (ca.1474 – 1542), writer, dramatist and musician.
Pedro Hernández (ca.1585 – 1665), sculptor, drawer and engraver of the Castilian school
Diego de Torres Villarroel (1693–1770), writer, poet, dramatist, doctor, mathematician, priest and professor of the University of Salamanca.
Manuel Francisco Álvarez de la Peña (1727–1797), Spanish sculptor.
Antonio Carnicero (1748–1814), painter of the Neoclassical style.
Ventura Ruiz Aguilera (1820–1881), a Spanish lyric poet. 
Tomás Bretón (1850–1923), conductor and composer.
Miguel de Unamuno (1864–1936), writer, novelist, poet, playwright, philosopher and academic
Pedro Garfias (1901–1967), poet.
María del Rosario López Piñuelas (born 1943), actress, stage name Charo Lopez
Yann Martel (born 1963), Canadian author of the Man Booker Prize–winning novel Life of Pi. 
Juan Carlos Fernández-Nieto (born 1987), a Spanish-American pianist.

Science & business 
Abraham Zacuto (1452 – ca.1515), astronomer, astrologer, mathematician, rabbi and historian
José Ignacio Sánchez Galán (born 1950), engineer and manager, CEO of Iberdrola
Mark Russinovich (born 1966) software engineer and author, CTO of Microsoft Azure.
Susana Marcos Celestino (born 1970), physicist works on human vision and applied optics.

Sport 

Vicente del Bosque (born 1950), footballer with 518 club caps and 18 for Spain and manager of Spain 2008/2016
Francisco Javier Sanz Alonso (1952–2022), Spanish Chess Championship winner (1973).
Teodora Ruano (born 1969) retired female track and road racing cyclist, competed in three Summer Olympics
Fátima Blázquez (born 1975) road cyclist, competed at the 1996 & 2000 Summer Olympics
Félix Prieto (born 1975), former footballer with 474 club caps
Ibán Cuadrado (born 1979), former footballer with 544 club caps
Jonathan Martín (born 1981), footballer with over 500 club caps
Óscar González (born 1982), footballer with over 438 club caps
Daniel Navarro (born 1983), a professional road bicycle racer
Carlos Peña (born 1983), footballer with 572 club caps 
Álvaro Arbeloa (born 1983), footballer with 344 club caps and 56 for Spain
Cristina González Ramos (born 1983), a retired handball goalkeeper with 142 caps for Spain
Javier Carpio (born 1984), footballer with over 440 club caps
Kike López (born 1988), footballer with over 480 club caps

See also
Salmanticenses and Complutenses
Monument to Columbus (Salamanca)

References

Bibliography

External links

City Council of Salamanca
Official Tourist Information Office
Wiki of the city of Salamanca
General information on Salamanca
General information about events in Salamanca
Salamanca travel guide
Salamanca city guide at HitchHikers Handbook
Flag of Salamanca

Museums
Art Nouveau and Art Decó Museum Casa Lis
Car History Museum
Cathedral Museum

 
Municipalities in the Province of Salamanca
Populated places established in the 3rd century BC
Province of Salamanca
World Heritage Sites in Spain
3rd-century BC establishments in Spain
Establishments in Spain in the Roman era